The name Mastercraft may refer to any of the following:

 MasterCraft, brand and manufacturer of recreational boats
 Mastercraft (tool brand), line of tools sold by Canadian Tire
 MasterCraft, brand of home improvement products sold by Menards stores in the United States
 Mastercraft, Australian brand and manufacturer of chocolates, later absorbed by Nestlé
 MSTRKRFT, electronic music group
 Mastercraft Homes, a Phoenix, Arizona-based home builder acquired by Lennar in 1973